Røros is a municipality in Trøndelag county, Norway. The administrative centre of the municipality is the town of Røros. Some of the villages in Røros include Brekken, Glåmos, Feragen, Galåa, and Hitterdalen.

The mining town of Røros (the administrative centre of the municipality) is sometimes called Bergstaden which means "mountain town" due to its historical notoriety for copper mining. It is one of two towns in Norway that were historically designated "mining towns", along with the "silver-town" of Kongsberg. The modern-day inhabitants of Røros still work and live in the characteristic 17th and 18th century buildings which led to its designation as a UNESCO World Heritage Site in 1980. Røros has about 80 wooden houses, most of them standing around courtyards. Many retain their dark pitch-log facades, giving the town a medieval appearance.

The  municipality is the 39th largest by area out of the 356 municipalities in Norway. Røros is the 169th most populous municipality in Norway with a population of 5,572.

General information
The parish of Røros was established as a municipality on 1 January 1838 (see formannskapsdistrikt law). On 1 January 1875, an unpopulated area of the neighbouring municipality of Ålen was transferred to Røros. On 1 January 1926, Røros was split into four municipalities: Røros landsogn (population: 701), Brekken (population: 1,098), Glåmos (population: 983), and the town of Røros (population: 2,284). During the 1960s, there were many municipal mergers across Norway due to the work of the Schei Committee. On 1 January 1964, the four municipalities of Glåmos (population: 700), Brekken (population: 964), Røros landsogn (population: 482), and the town of Røros (population: 3,063) were all reunited under the name Røros. On 21 April 1989, an unpopulated part of Røros was transferred to the neighbouring Holtålen municipality.  On 1 January 2018, the municipality switched from the old Sør-Trøndelag county to the new Trøndelag county.

Name
The municipality (originally the parish and town) is named after the old Røros farm since this was the site of the mining town of Røros. The first element comes from the local river name Røa  which has an unknown meaning. The municipality is also named Plaassja, the official name in the Southern Sami language (the meaning of which is unknown).

Coat of arms
The coat of arms was granted on 29 October 1992. The blazon is "Gules, a venus symbol over a crossed hammer and chisel Or". This means the arms have a red field (background) and the charge is a venus symbol over a crossed hammer and chisel. The charge has a tincture of Or which means it is commonly colored yellow, but if it is made out of metal, then gold is used. The design symbolizes the copper mining industry in Røros. The venus symbol is the old symbol for copper which was heavily mined in Røros for centuries. The arms were designed by Sverre Ødegaard. The municipal flag has the same design as the coat of arms.

Churches
The Church of Norway has four parishes within the municipality of Røros. It is part of the Gauldal prosti (deanery) in the Diocese of Nidaros.

History
Røros municipality has historically been used by the Southern Sami people for reindeer herding. Known for its copper mines, Røros is one of Norway's two nationally significant mining towns with activity starting in the 17th century (the other one being the "silver-town" Kongsberg, see Kongsberg Silver Mines).

Røros was burned to the ground in 1678 and 1679 by the Swedish Army during the Scanian War. In 1718, during the Great Northern War, the town was once again taken by the Swedish Army, led by General De la Barre, who made up the southern arm of the main Swedish Army under Carl Gustaf Armfeldt. De la Barre took the city and all their mined copper at gunpoint.

When King Carl XII was killed near Fredriksten on 30 November 1718, De la Barre retreated north to join the bulk of the army. However, this ended in tragedy, when over 3,000 rather unprepared soldiers perished in the harsh weather conditions in the mountains northwest of Røros.

Røros and its people were made famous to Norwegians at the turn of the 20th century by semi-fictional author Johan Falkberget, who told the story of the mining community from the perspective of the hard-tested miners at the bottom of the social ladder.

With its authentic wooden buildings, Røros was added to the UNESCO World Heritage Site list in 1980.

Røros Copper Works
In 1644, the general manager of the mine at Kongsberg gave permission to exploit one lode of copper in the mountains near Rauhaammaaren. Storvola and Gamle Storwartz became some of the company's most important mines. Nordgruve, another important mining area, was situated to the north east of Røros.

In 1685, Røros discovered a considerable amount of associated silver mines. The mining activity lasted for about 40 years, and a total of 1,350 tons of sterling silver was mined. This provided considerable revenue for the Danish-Norwegian treasury to support Frederick IV in building the palace of Solbjerg.

1740 onwards saw a period of greatness for the Røros Copper Works with several mines yielding well. Due to the funding of the Oldenburg royal family, the scale of the Leros silver mine and copper mine expanded. As the mine is close to Trondheim and at a lower latitude, the ore output is much higher than ScandinaviaFalun. The rich income of the mining area also prompted the royal family to repeatedly ask for an expansion of the mining. Dynamite was utilised from 1870 and later drilling machines. The electrical generating station built high-tension power lines to supply the mines, starting in 1897. The Bessemer process was introduced at the end of the 1800s. The Rørosbanen railway line was completed in 1877. High prices for both copper and zinc gave good results, but then the prices dropped and there were several years with large losses. After 333 years, mining activity in Røros ceased in 1977.

Culture
During winter, a traditional market called "Rørosmartnan" is organised, drawing an average 60,000–70,000 tourists to the town of Røros each year. The market begins on the last Tuesday in February and lasts five days.  There is also an outdoor musical theatre performance played in Røros to commemorate the tragedy when the Swedish soldiers froze to death. This show has been played since 1994.

The town of Røros was the filming location for Henrik Ibsen's play "A Doll's House", directed by Joseph Losey.

Media
The newspapers Arbeidets Rett and Fjell-Ljom are published in Røros.

Government
All municipalities in Norway, including Røros, are responsible for primary education (up to 10th grade), outpatient health services, senior citizen services, unemployment and other social services, zoning, economic development, and municipal roads. The municipality is governed by a municipal council of elected representatives, which in turn elects a mayor. The municipality falls under the Trøndelag District Court and the Frostating Court of Appeal.

Municipal council
The municipal council of Røros is made up of 27 representatives who are elected to four-year terms. The party breakdown of the council is as follows:

Mayors
The mayors of Røros:

1838–1845: Knud Olsen 
1846–1847: Peter Ascanius Schult 
1848–1850: Julius Begtrup 
1851–1856: Diderik Iversen Tønseth
1857–1860: Johannes Berg
1861–1882: Diderik Iversen Tønseth (V)
1883–1901: Anders Bergan (V)
1902–1904: Marius Müller (H)
1905–1913: Lars T. Ormhaug (V)
1914–1919: Lars Tørres (Ap)
1920–1922: Johannes Iv. Ødegaard (Ap)
1923–1925: Anders O. Sandkjernan (Bp)
(Municipality was divided into four other municipalities from 1926-1964.)
1964–1967: Ole J. Kværneng (Ap)
1968–1971: Per A. Strickert (Ap)
1972–1973: Rolf Køste (Ap)
1973–1975: Per A. Strickert (Ap)
1976–1979: Knut W. Larssen (Ap)
1980–1987: Erling Sven Busch (Ap)
1987-1987: Anders Døhl (Ap)
1988-1993: Arne Kokkvoll (Ap)
1993-1999: Even Erlien (Sp)
1999-2007: John Helge Andersen (Ap)
2007-2019: Hans Vintervold (Ap)
2019–present: Isak Veierud Busch (Ap)

Geography
The largest lake within the municipality is Aursund and the river Glåma has its origin here. The most northerly part of Femund, the third largest lake in Norway, is located in Røros, just west of Femundsmarka National Park. These lakes and others in Røros, such as Bolagen and Flensjøen, are well suited for kayaking and fishing. Other lakes include Feragen, Håsjøen, Rambergsjøen, Korssjøen, Nedre Roasten, Rogen, and Rien.

Climate
Røros has a subarctic climate. The coldest months recorded are January 1941 and January 1942, both with mean , and average daily low  in January 1941. Winters at Røros are reliably cold. The warmest January (1973) had mean , the warmest winter month on record was December 2006 with mean , and the warmest March (2012) had mean . The heat record  was recorded in July 2008.

Skiing conditions in winter are usually excellent, with the period from February to April being the optimum, as the sun is higher and the days longer than earlier in winter. In more recent years,  snow on the ground was recorded in March 2009. Snow on the ground is virtually guaranteed in Røros from December to early April. Early May 1997 saw 76 cm snow on the ground (source: eklima/met.no).

All the record lows are old, the most recent (December) from 1978, while more than half of the monthly record highs are from year 2000 or later.

Transportation
The municipality is served by the Rørosbanen railway line at Røros Station. Røros Airport has a scheduled service to Oslo. Norwegian County Road 30 (Fylkesvei 30) connects Røros to the south to Tynset and northwest down the Gaula valley towards Trondheim. There is also the Norwegian County Road 705 going north to Selbu and Stjørdal, and the  Norwegian County Road 31  (Fylkesvei 31) going east to Sweden.

Notable people 

 Lorentz Lossius (1589–1654) a German-born, Norwegian mining engineer, founder of the Røros Copper Works (Røros Kobberverk)
 Michael Rosing (1756 in Røros – 1818) a Norwegian-Danish actor
 Ole Andreas Bachke (1830 in Røros – 1890) Norwegian jurist and Government Minister
 Johan Falkberget (1879 in Røros – 1967) an author, nominee for the Nobel Prize in Literature
 Johannes Smemo (1898 in Rugldalen – 1973) a theologian and Bishop of Oslo 1951 to 1968
 Magnus Falkberget (1900 in Røros – 1957) a Norwegian actor and theatre manager 
 Sven Nyhus (born 1932 in Røros) a folk musician, fiddler, composer and musicologist
 Per Edgar Kokkvold (born 1946 in Røros) journalist, chair of the Norwegian Broadcasting Council
 Synnøve Korssjøen (born 1949 in Røros) a Norwegian goldsmith
 Even Erlien (born 1955) a politician, Mayor of Røros municipality until 1999
 Per Bergersen (1960 – 1990 in Røros) a musician
 Dag Rune Olsen (born 1962 in Røros) a cancer researcher and professor of biomedical physics

Sport 
 Stein Erik Gullikstad (born 1952 in Røros) a Nordic combined skier, competed at the 1976 Winter Olympics
 Kjell Jakob Sollie (born 1953 in Røros) a cross-country skier, competed at the 1980 Winter Olympics

Media gallery

References

External links

Municipal fact sheet from Statistics Norway 
History of Røros at Bergstaden.Org 
World heritage site Røros
Røros info 
UNESCO Røros entry
Visitnorway.com Røros
Map hiking and DNT cabins
VR images of Røros
Haugan, Røros, Norway

 
Municipalities of Trøndelag
World Heritage Sites in Norway
Populated places on the Glomma River
1838 establishments in Norway
1926 disestablishments in Norway
1964 establishments in Norway